Abdellah Rezzoug or Abdella Zarok was a Libyan filmmaker. In the early 1970s he made the first Libyan feature film, When Fate Hardens.

Films
 When Fate Hardens / Destiny Is Hard (Indama Yaqsu al-Zaman), 1973.
 Symphony of Rain (Ma’azufatu  al-matar), 1991.

References

External links
 

Year of birth missing
Possibly living people
Libyan film directors